Steven Wayne "Steve" Rocha (born 1960) is an American-born Portuguese retired basketball player and a current coach. He played as a center. Rocha is of Portuguese origin and latter settled in Portugal, where he became one of the best players for his adopted country. He has a degree in Business Administration at the University of San Diego and was working on his master's degree in Physical Education.

Career
Born in Modesto, California, he first played at Modesto High School, then at Modesto Junior College, for two years, and at the University of San Diego. After that, he moved to Portugal, where he spent 13 years of his career, the other being spent in Germany.

He played for some of the best Portuguese teams, Sangalhos, FC Porto and Ovarense, before being assigned to Benfica. He was a leading name in their golden era of basketball, winning 2 titles of National Champion and 5 Cups of Portugal.

Rocha went to become also a charismatic player for Portugal, with 61 caps, from 1988 to 1993.

After ending his career, he became a basketball coach. He coached for five years in the Portuguese LCB, then returning to the United States. He was assistant coach at CSU Stanislaus and he's currently at Modesto Junior College.

References
https://web.archive.org/web/20080723204628/http://www.mjc.edu/mjcAthletics/Athletic%20%20Sport%20Schedules/Basketball%20Men/New%20Basketbal%20M%20home%20pages%20.htm

External links
Steve Rocha FIBA Archive
Steve Rocha Sports Reference

1960 births
Living people
American men's basketball coaches
American men's basketball players
American people of Portuguese descent
Basketball players from California
Centers (basketball)
Junior college men's basketball players in the United States
Portuguese basketball coaches
Portuguese men's basketball players
FC Porto basketball players
S.L. Benfica basketball players
San Diego Toreros men's basketball players